Damián Oscar Lemos (born 31 January 1989) is an Argentine professional footballer who plays as a midfielder for Primera Nacional side San Martín de San Juan.

Career
Lemos started in the youth system of Deportivo de González Catán in 1994, leaving in 2004 to join Nueva Chicago. His senior career started in 2007 with Nueva Chicago. He remained with the club for nine years, making one hundred and eighty appearances and scoring once in all competitions across various seasons in Primera B Nacional, Primera B Metropolitana and the Argentine Primera División; he made his top-flight debut for Nueva Chicago in February 2015 against Belgrano. Ahead of 2010–11, Lemos was loaned to Primera B Nacional team Deportivo Merlo. Thirty-one appearances followed.

Three seasons later, after nineteen more appearances for Nueva Chicago, Lemos left on loan again to join Ferro Carril Oeste in July 2013. His first appearance for Ferro Carril Oeste came during a 2–2 draw with Boca Unidos on 3 August. In his eighteenth appearance, Lemos was sent off in a goalless tie versus Huracán. In total, he featured thirty-two times in all competitions for Ferro Carril Oeste. He remained with Nueva Chicago for two more seasons, prior to departing in January 2016 to play for Primera División side Patronato. On 6 February, Lemos made his debut versus San Lorenzo.

Ahead of the 2022 season, Lemos joined Primera Nacional side San Martín de San Juan.

Career statistics
.

References

External links

1989 births
Living people
People from La Matanza Partido
Argentine footballers
Association football midfielders
Primera Nacional players
Primera B Metropolitana players
Argentine Primera División players
Nueva Chicago footballers
Deportivo Merlo footballers
Ferro Carril Oeste footballers
Club Atlético Patronato footballers
San Martín de San Juan footballers
Sportspeople from Buenos Aires Province